Durgesh Pathak is an Indian politician and Member of Legislative Assembly in Delhi. He is a senior member of the Aam Aadmi Party and Political Affairs Committee (the highest decision-making body) and National Executive In-charge of the party. 

He won the Delhi Assembly by-election, 2022 as the AAP candidate for the seat of MLA from the Rajendra Nagar assembly constituency in Delhi.

Early life and career 
He completed Master's in English from Allahabad University and moved to Delhi in 2010.

Politics
In 2013, he managed the election campaign for AAP national convenor Arvind Kejriwal and helped defeat Sheila Dixit the incumbent Delhi Chief Minister.

He is a member of Political Affairs Committee (the highest decision-making body) and National Executive In-charge of the party. He is in-charge of Municipal Corporation of Delhi election for AAP.

In June 2022, he contested from Rajendra Nagar in Delhi Assembly by-election, 2022 against BJP's candidate Rajesh Bhatia and won by 11,000 lead.

Electoral performance

References

External links
 
 
  

 
 

 

Living people
People from New Delhi
Delhi MLAs 2020–2025
Aam Aadmi Party MLAs from Delhi
University of Allahabad alumni
Year of birth missing (living people)